Martina Šalek (born 8 October 1994) is a Croatian football midfielder currently playing in the Croatian 1st Division for ŽNK Osijek, with whom she has also played the Champions League. She is an U-19 international.

External links

References

1994 births
Living people
Croatian women's footballers
Croatia women's international footballers
Women's association football midfielders
Croatian Women's First Football League players
ŽNK Osijek players